Reserved matters may refer to
Reserved and excepted matters which are subject to UK Parliamentary jurisdiction rather than to devolved government
Reserved matters in regard to outline planning permission in the United Kingdom, which need to be addressed before full planning permission is granted.